Jane Alexander (born 1974) is a Scottish novelist, visual artist, illustrator, designer, and short story writer originally from Aberdeen.

Life
Alexander studied Illustration at Edinburgh College of Art and completed a Master of Philosophy in Creative Writing at Glasgow University ten years later. She is now pursuing a PhD in Creative Writing at Northumbria University. She released her first novel The Last Treasure Hunt, which was published by Saraband Books in 2015 and is called a ‘a modern media morality tale’. Before her first novel, she has also written several short stories. Her short story 'In Yon Green Hill To Dwell' was the winner of The Fiction Desk Ghost Story Competition in 2014. Her stories range in audience age from mid-grade to adult. She is Deputy Programme Director, MSc in Creative Writing (Online) at the University of Edinburgh and associate lecturer in Creative Writing with the Open University.

Alexander is currently based in Edinburgh, where she has been living for the past twenty years. She is a member of the National Association of Writers in Education.

Awards
Scottish Arts Council (now Creative Scotland) New Writer’s Award, 2006
Creative Scotland research grant, 2012
The Fiction Desk Ghost Story Competition, 2014
Current Creative Writing PhD research, funded by Northumbria University

Bibliography
Short stories
'Candlemaker Row'
'In Yon Green Hill To Dwell'
'Now Here'
'Time-keeping In Public Places'
'Ninety-nine Tae Wan Against'

Novels

References

External links
Jane Alexander's 'The top 10 treasure hunts in fiction' on The Guardian
The Fiction Desk interview on 'In Yon Green Hill To Dwell'
Jane Alexander's website: janealexander.net

 

Scottish short story writers
21st-century Scottish novelists
21st-century Scottish women writers
People associated with Edinburgh
1974 births
Living people